Hipólito José da Costa Pereira Furtado de Mendonça (August 13, 1774 – September 11, 1823) was a Brazilian journalist and diplomat considered to be the "father of Brazilian press".

He is the patron of the 17th chair of the Brazilian Academy of Letters.

Life
Costa was born in Colônia do Sacramento, now part of Uruguay, to alferes Félix da Costa Furtado de Mendonça and Ana Josefa Pereira. His brother was José Saturnino da Costa Pereira, who would be a senator of the Empire of Brazil and commander of the Brazilian Army. Although they had converted to Christianity, his family, the da Costas, came from a long line of Sephardic Jews who were active in Portugal, England and the West Indies.

In 1777, the family moved to Pelotas, in Rio Grande do Sul, where Costa would spend his adolescence, until he was sent to the University of Coimbra in 1798, where he graduated in Law, Philosophy and Mathematics.

Recently graduated, he was sent on diplomatic missions to the United States and Mexico by then-Portuguese prime minister Rodrigo de Sousa Coutinho. He would live in the U.S. for two years, more precisely in Philadelphia, where he became a Freemason. He wrote an account of his trip to Philadelphia, named Diário de Minha Viagem para a Filadélfia, but it would be only published in 1955.

Two years after his trip to the U.S. he returned to Brazil, where he would receive another mission, this time for England, in 1802. However, three or four years later, when he returned to Brazil, he was arrested by the Portuguese Inquisition, by order of Pina Manique, since he was accused of spreading Masonic ideas through Europe. However, he was able to escape prison and fled to Spain, disguised as a lackey. From Spain, he returned to England, where he received protection of Prince Augustus Frederick. Da Costa continued his masonic activities in England, having joined two masonic lodges under the auspices of the Premier Grand Lodge of England; the Lodge of the Nine Muses (1807) and then the Lodge of Antiquity (1808).

Settling down in the city of London, he then founded what would be the first Brazilian journal: the Correio Braziliense, which ran from 1808 to 1823. Through this journal, Costa would spread Liberal ideas. However, the Portuguese ambassador in London, Bernardo José de Abrantes e Castro, Count of Funchal, was an extreme combatant of Costa's journal, and would create one of himself, entitled O Investigador Português em Inglaterra (The Portuguese Investigator in England), which ran from 1811 to 1819. Many other journals which fought the Correio Braziliense were created.

Costa died in 1823, without knowing that he was proclaimed consul of Brazil in England. He was buried in the church of Saint Mary the Virgin, in Hurley, Berkshire, but in 2001 his remains were brought to Brazil, and can now be found at the Museu da Imprensa Nacional.

He was also famous for translating into Portuguese works by Benjamin Thompson and Benjamin Smith Barton.

Honors
The Museu de Comunicação Social Hipólito José da Costa, in Porto Alegre, is named after him.

References

External links
 Hipólito da Costa's biography at the official site of the Brazilian Academy of Letters 

1774 births
1823 deaths
Brazilian journalists
Brazilian diplomats
Brazilian translators
Brazilian emigrants to the United States
Patrons of the Brazilian Academy of Letters
English–Portuguese translators
Freemasons of the Premier Grand Lodge of England
Catholicism and Freemasonry
18th-century Brazilian writers
19th-century Brazilian writers
Brazilian Freemasons
19th-century Brazilian male writers